The Flying Ace is a 1926 black-and-white silent drama film directed by Richard E. Norman with an all-African-American cast. This six-reel film, made by Norman Studios in Jacksonville, Florida, utilized a mix of professionals such as leads Laurence Criner and Kathryn Boyd,  and non-professional actors.  

Films such as The Flying Ace, that used an all-African-American cast and were shown specifically to African-American audiences, were known as "race films". Norman Studios produced feature length and numerous short race films during the 1920s. The untapped black filmgoing market and the plethora of talented performers unable to get work in mainstream films led to the production of race films by Norman Studios.

Richard Norman's reason for producing race films was not solely a business decision. Although the studio was filling a niche, Norman was also motivated by the state of race relations at the time and wanted to make a positive impact.

In 2021, the film was selected for preservation in the United States National Film Registry by the Library of Congress as being "culturally, historically, or aesthetically significant".

Plot
At the train station in Mayport, Florida, Paymaster Blair Kimball (Boise De Legge) arrives a day early. Dr. A. G. Maynard (Sam Jordan), the local dentist and Constable Jed Splivins (Lions Daniels) greet him, as pilot Finley Tucker (Harold Platts) looks on.

Kimball is carrying $25,000 for the railroad payroll. Waiting with station master Thomas Sawtelle (George Colvin) in his office, Sawtelle's daughter Ruth (Kathryn Boyd) comes with her father's lunch. When she sees Finley, she asks for a ride in his new aircraft. After the flight, he proposes for the 100th time, but Ruth says she is not certain she loves him.

Captain Billy Stokes (Laurence Criner), a World War I fighter pilot, known as "The Flying Ace" because of his downing of seven enemy aircraft in France, returns home to resume his former job as a railroad detective. General manager Howard MacAndrews (R.L. Brown) assigns Stokes to find Kimball, who has gone missing along with the $25,000 company payroll, and apprehend a gang of railroad thieves.

Stokes suspects that Finley is to blame, which is confirmed when he finds Kimball alive and hidden in the tail of Finley's plane. With the help of Peg (Steve Reynolds), Stokes identifies Constable Splivins as a member of Finley's gang, and arrests him. A desperate and crazed Finley flies off with Ruth, whom he has drugged. Stokes chases Finley in his own aircraft but is afraid for Ruth's safety. Shaking his captive and reviving her, Finley says Ruth has to kiss him, or "get out and walk on a cloud."

Suddenly, Finley's aircraft catches fire but Stokes is nearby, dropping a rope ladder to Ruth, who climbs into Stokes' aircraft. Failing to put out the fire, Finley dons a parachute and jumps safely, only to be arrested on the ground. After her ordeal, Stokes comforts Ruth, and makes his feelings about her known.

Cast

 Laurence Criner as Capt. Billy Stokes (as Lawrence Criner)
 Kathryn Boyd as Ruth Sawtelle
 Boise De Legge as Blair Kimball
 Harold Platts as Finley Tucker
 Lions Daniels as Constable Jed Splivins
 George Colvin as Thomas Sawtelle
 Sam Jordan as Dr. Maynard
 R.L. Brown as Howard McAndrews (credited as Dr. R.L. Brown)
 Steve Reynolds as Peg (credited as Steve "Peg" Reynolds)

Production
With principal photography in Jacksonville, Florida, The Flying Ace was an example of producer Norman's "home talent" films, in which he would travel to various towns with stock footage and a basic script. After recruiting local celebrities for minor roles, they would film a small portion of footage (approximately 200 feet of new material) over the course of a few days. The films were processed at Norman's laboratory in Chicago. Once completed, the films would be screened and any funds raised would be split between Norman and the town where the scenes were shot.

Norman cast J. Laurence Criner, a veteran of Harlem’s prestigious all-black theater troupe the Lafayette Players, in the leading role of Captain Billy Stokes, a black pilot who fought in France during World War I. While Eugene Bullard was a black pilot in the Lafayette Escadrille, African-Americans were not allowed to serve as pilots in the United States Army Air Corps until 1940.

The role of pilot Ruth Sawtelle, played by Kathryn Boyd, is loosely based on African-American aviator Bessie Coleman.  Coleman had sent a letter to the Norman Studios expressing a wish to be in a film based on her life. Only a day before she was to appear in an exhibition in Jacksonville, she lost her life on April 30, 1926, when she fell from her aircraft. It is unclear whether Norman and Coleman had met.

The Flying Ace was advertised as "the greatest airplane thriller ever filmed"; however, save for one brief sequence, the film was filmed entirely on the ground, using camera tricks, such as the creative use of the camera to create the upside down sequences to imply movement and altitude for the stationary aircraft.  A full-scale mock-up of a Curtiss JN-4 biplane was also constructed.

Reception
Megan Pugh writes, in an essay for the San Francisco Silent Film Festival in 2010, "While it’s impossible to measure the influence The Flying Ace had on its viewers, it is reasonable to assume that audiences found its lead character inspirational."

The Flying Ace is the only one of the Norman Studios-produced "race movies" that is known to have survived. The Library of Congress keeps a copy of the film as it is deemed culturally significant.

Additionally, The Flying Ace is still shown in many silent film festivals and theaters. Its first public screening in decades took place in July 2010, at the San Francisco Silent Film Festival, where a restored print of The Flying Ace was shown at the Castro Theatre.

References

Notes

Citations

Bibliography

 Berry, S. Torriano and  Venise T. Berry. Historical Dictionary of African American Cinema. Lanham, Maryland: Rowman & Littlefield, 2015. .
 Hart, Phillip. Up in the Air: the Story of Bessie Coleman. Minneapolis: Carolrhoda, 1996. p. 62. .
 Lupack, Barbara Tepa. Richard E. Norman and Race Filmmaking. Bloomington: Indiana University Press, 2013. .
 McCarthy, Kevin. African American Sites in Florida. Sarasota, Florida: Pineapple, 2007. .
 Rich, Doris. Queen Bess: Daredevil Aviator. Washington, D.C.: Smithsonian Institution Press, 1993. .

External links
 
 
 
 
 alternate lobby poster

1926 films
1926 crime films
African-American films
American silent feature films
American aviation films
American black-and-white films
Films shot in Jacksonville, Florida
United States National Film Registry films
1920s American films
1920s English-language films